The 2018 World Junior B Curling Championships was held from January 3 to 10 at the Kisakallio Sports Institute in Lohja, Finland. The top three men’s and women’s teams at the World Junior B Curling Championships would qualify for the 2018 World Junior Curling Championships.

Men

Round-robin standings
Final round-robin standings

Qualification Game
Tuesday, January 9, 14:00

Playoffs

Quarterfinals
Tuesday, January 9, 19:00

Semifinals
Wednesday, January 10, 9:00

Bronze-medal game
Wednesday, January 10, 14:00

Gold-medal game
Wednesday, January 10, 14:00

Women

Round-robin standings
Final round-robin standings

Qualification Game
Tuesday, January 9, 9:00

Playoffs

Quarterfinals
Tuesday, January 9, 14:00

Semifinals
Wednesday, January 10, 9:00

Bronze-medal game
Wednesday, January 10, 14:00

Gold-medal game
Wednesday, January 10, 14:00

References

External links
Official Website

 
2018 in curling
Lohja
2018 in Finnish sport
Curling
2018
International curling competitions hosted by Finland
January 2018 sports events in Europe